Koniowo  is a village in the administrative district of Gmina Trzebnica, within Trzebnica County, Lower Silesian Voivodeship, in south-western Poland.

The name of the village is of Polish origin and comes from the word koń, which means "horse".

References

Villages in Trzebnica County